Karin Schmalfeld (born 19 February 1976) is a German orienteering competitor.

She received a silver medal in the individual event at the World Games in 2005. She also competed in the mixed relay, where Germany finished 6th. Schmalfeld had the fourth and last leg, and advanced the German team from 11th to 6th position.

She has competed in eight World Orienteering Championships, between 1995 and 2009. Her best results were 9th in the short distance in 2001, 9th in the long distance in 2003, and 5th in the relay in 1995 with the German team.

Junior career
Schmalfeld received a silver medal in the short distance in 1995 and a bronze medal in the classic distance in 1996 at the Junior World Orienteering Championships.

References

External links
 
 

1976 births
Living people
German orienteers
Foot orienteers
Female orienteers
World Games silver medalists
Competitors at the 2005 World Games
World Games medalists in orienteering
Junior World Orienteering Championships medalists